Rhodothemis is a genus of dragonflies in the family Libellulidae. 
The species occur from India, through Southeast Asia to Australia.

Species
The genus Rhodothemis includes the following species:

References

External links

 

Libellulidae
Anisoptera genera
Odonata of Asia
Odonata of Australia
Taxa named by Friedrich Ris
Insects described in 1909